Prema Raga Haadu Gelathi is a 1997 Indian Kannada-language romantic drama film directed by Sunil Kumar Desai based on Yandamuri Veerendranath's novel Nishyabda translated into Kannada by Sharadatanaya. The movie was produced by Jayashree Devi. The film stars Shiva Rajkumar, Ramesh Aravind and Nivedita Jain.

The film marked the reunion of the director Desai, producer Jayashree Devi, actors Shiva Rajkumar and Ramesh Aravind and music composer Ilaiyaraaja after their successful venture Nammoora Mandara Hoove in 1996. However, this film could not taste the same success as the previous venture.

Cast 

 Shiva Rajkumar 
 Ramesh Aravind
 Nivedita Jain
 Srinath
 Lokesh
 Loknath
 Bhavyashri Rai
 Vaishali Kasaravalli
 Sihi Kahi Chandru
 Archana
 Shivaram
 Renukamma Murugod
 Kunigal Nagabhushan

Soundtrack 
The soundtrack of the film was composed by Ilaiyaraaja who teamed up with the director after the successful score in Nammoora Mandara Hoove (1996).

References

External links 

 Film thyview

1997 films
1990s Kannada-language films
1997 romantic drama films
Films scored by Ilaiyaraaja
Indian romantic drama films
Films set in Karnataka
Films shot in Karnataka
Films directed by Sunil Kumar Desai